Tei Seki (関　禎) was a rear admiral in the Imperial Japanese Navy. He was from Chiba. He was a graduate of the Etajima Naval Academy in Class 36, on 21 November 1908. He was killed in action during World War II.

The date of his promotion is probably 31 January 1944 and his flag rank is probably posthumous but a source is needed.

Assignments
Captain-Ret Seki Tei (former CO of Santo Maru) was posted as the Chief Equipping Officer of IJN submarine tender Tsukushi Maru on 15 January 1943.

Death
Tei Seki was killed in action 31 January 1944 when converted submarine tender  was torpedoed. On 24 January 1944, Yasukuni Maru was assigned to a troop convoy departing Tateyama, Chiba for Truk. Escorting destroyer  recovered only 43 survivors. Captain Tei Seki was amongst those lost.

The Japanese Dōmei news agency reported on 22 September 1944 that he had "died in action" but gave no details.

The dispatch, recorded by a Federal Communications Commission monitor, said that the Yokosuka naval station, near Tokyo, had listed him as a fatality.

References

Japanese admirals of World War II